Prairie Creek may refer to:

 Prairie Creek, Arkansas
 Prairie Creek, Florida in Alachua County, FL
 Prairie Creek, Indiana
 Prairie Creek Redwoods State Park, in California
 Prairie Creek (California)
 Prairie Creek (Iowa River tributary), a stream in Iowa
 Prairie Creek (Brush Creek tributary), a stream in Missouri
 Prairie Creek (Cowskin Creek tributary), a stream in Missouri
 Prairie Creek (Platte River tributary), a stream in Missouri
 Prairie Creek (Rapid Creek), a stream in South Dakota
Prairie Creek (Paluxy River tributary), a stream in Texas
 Prairie Creek (Chehalis River tributary), a stream in Washington
 Prairie Creek Township (disambiguation)